The Kalbådagrund Lighthouse is a lighthouse located on a dangerous shoal near the centerline of the Gulf of Finland about 12 km (7.5 mi) from shore and about 25 km (15 mi) south of Porvoo and was Finland's first caisson lighthouse.

Construction 
Construction of the lighthouse began in the spring of 1950 on the Suomenlinna shipyard. The tower was erected during the autumn of 1952, the caisson was sunk to a depth of  about 12 km (7.5 mi) from shore and about 25 km (15 mi) south of Porvoo. The design of the lighthouse is similar to that of several Swedish Baltic Sea lighthouses and she was painted with red and white horizontal bands.

Service 
The lighthouse's white flashing light was lit for the first time in the autumn of 1953. In 1977, the tower's construction was reinforced and a helicopter landing pad was built on the roof. Today she is fitted with incorporating keeper's quarters and three galleries. The lighthouse is operated from Harmaja pilot station and can only be accessed by boat.

See also

References 

Lighthouses in Finland
Lighthouses completed in 1953